Zerre is the fifth studio album of Replikas, released in November, 2008 with Peyote Music.

In order to capture huge and organic sounds not found in a normal studio, the band went to Gokceada (an island in the Aegean Sea) and transformed a former prison into a recording studio.  Production, recording and mix processes were carried out by Metin Bozkurt and Replikas members and mastering was done by Kim Rosen in New York’s West West Side Studios.

Track listing
 Bu Sıkıntı
 Zerre
 Bugün Varım Yarın Yokum
 Dulcinea
 Bitti Deme
 Vakt-i Kerahat
 Bozuk Düzen
 Boş Vücut
 Gülmediğin Günler
 Hortum
 Eksik
 Ruh Feza
 Tuaf (Hidden track)

Line up
Gökçe Akçelik
Selçuk Artut
Orçun Baştürk
Barkın Engin
Burak Tamer

2008 albums
Replikas albums